Pihlajamäki (Finnish), Rönnbacka (Swedish) is a northern-central quarter in Helsinki, the capital of Finland. It is part of the Malmi neighbourhood and the Latokartano district.

Pihlajamäki is an important site for modern Finnish architecture, and it is the first of Helsinki's suburbs built in the 1960s that was conserved en bloc with a town plan. The architecture of the suburb is unassuming, but there is a distinct polarity in the buildings and surrounding scenery, which creates rich nuances.

References

External links

Pihlajamäki modern architectural heritage trail

Neighbourhoods of Helsinki
Modernist architecture in Finland